Piotr Pawel Polczak (born 25 August 1986) is a Polish former professional footballer who played as a central defender. He currently serves as the sporting director of Zagłębie Sosnowiec.

Club career
In February 2011, he joined Russian club Terek Grozny on three and a half year contract.

On 3 July 2017 he signed a contract with Romanian side Astra Giurgiu.

International career
He made his first appearance for the Polish national team in a friendly against Ukraine on August 20, 2008.

References

External links 
 
 
 
 

1986 births
Living people
Footballers from Kraków
Polish footballers
Poland international footballers
Association football defenders
Ekstraklasa players
GKS Katowice players
I liga players
MKS Cracovia (football) players
Zagłębie Sosnowiec players
Russian Premier League players
FC Akhmat Grozny players
FC Volga Nizhny Novgorod players
Liga I players
FC Astra Giurgiu players
Polish expatriate footballers
Expatriate footballers in Russia
Polish expatriate sportspeople in Russia
Expatriate footballers in Romania
Polish expatriate sportspeople in Romania